The Iacetani or Jacetani (iakketanoi in Greek, or ) were a pre-Roman people who populated the area north of Aragon (Spain). They settled the Ebro valley, specifically in the area along the Pyrenees. Its capital was Iaca (now Jaca). According to Strabo, their land stretched from the Pyrenees to Lleida and Huesca. It is believed that they could be related to the Aquitanes. They were known to stamp coins. They also appear in the texts of Pliny the Elder and Ptolemy.

Their affiliation with the Vascones is disputable, as they inhabited an area in the high Aragon river valley (today's northwestern corner of Aragon). Strabo mentions Iacetani in his Sertorius chronicles as people independent from the Vascones, although another Greek historian, Ptolemy identified them with the Vascones. According to some theories, they may have originated from the Aquitanians who crossed the Pyrenees and settled in the southern slopes of the mountains along with the Vascones (they could be related peoples or tribes with a common origin but not the same people).

These mountain people were bordered to the south by the Suessetani of the plains, who were often looted by the inhabitants of Iaca.

Iacetani were defeated by the Romans in 195 BC when Cato the Elder took their capital with the support of Suessetani, which distracted the Iacetanian army. Starting from this event in the early 2nd century BC, the Iacetani no longer appear in classical sources, although they continue minting coins with the inscription "IACA", which is coincident with their being mentioned by Strabo, dating between the 1st century BC and early in the 1st century AD.

There accounts, however, that Julius Caesar interacted with the tribe and this was documented in his writings, citing the Iacetani as one of the tribes that changed allegiances to him alongside the Ausetani and Illurgavoness during his campaign extending the Roman frontier. This event happened shortly after Decimus Brutus defeated Domitius' fleet in the war against the Veneti and increased Caesar's reputation among the natives prompting the Iacetani to begin sending envoys and even agreed to supply him with corn.

In the year 19 their territory was incorporated into the Roman Empire, after the Cantabrian Wars, as vassals of Rome. This meant that they did not enjoy the citizenship status, and their situation was precarious compared to other peoples of the region, such as the Sedetani.

References 

 VV. AA., Los Aragoneses, Madrid, Istmo (Fundamentos 57), 1977, pages 70–71. .

External links 
 Page on Iberian currency 
 Encyclopedia of Aragon 
 Great Encyclopedia Rialp on Iacetani

Iberians
Pre-Roman peoples of the Iberian Peninsula
Tribes conquered by Rome